is a Japanese rugby union player who can play either as a fly-half or centre.

Career
Tatekawa started his professional career in Japan's Top League playing for Kubota Spears in Chiba. His impressive record made the former  national coach Eddie Jones recommend him to Brumbies' boss Stephen Larkham.  The Brumbies were looking for new talent in the 10/12 area due to an injury to Christian Lealiifano and were happy to take him on as part of their development plan. The former Wallabies and Spears player Toutai Kefu sang Tatekawa's praises on signing for the Brumbies, saying he was the best Japanese player he had ever seen.

International
Tatekawa made his international debut for the Brave Blossoms in an away match against Kazakhstan in April 2012. To date he has made 39 appearances and scored 59 points including seven tries.

References

1989 births
Japanese rugby union players
Japan international rugby union players
Rugby union fly-halves
Rugby union centres
Living people
Kubota Spears Funabashi Tokyo Bay players
Japanese expatriate rugby union players
Expatriate rugby union players in Australia
Japanese expatriate sportspeople in Australia
People from Nara, Nara
Sunwolves players
Otago rugby union players
ACT Brumbies players